Brooke Voigt (born 17 November 1993) is a Canadian freestyle snowboarder. She grew up in Fort McMurray, Alberta and graduated from the National Sports School in Calgary.

Career

Winter Olympics
Voigt was named to Canada's 2018 Olympic team in the slopestyle and big air events.

In January 2022, Voigt was named to Canada's 2022 Olympic team.

References 

Canadian female snowboarders
1993 births
Living people
Snowboarders at the 2018 Winter Olympics
Snowboarders at the 2022 Winter Olympics
Olympic snowboarders of Canada

People from Fort McMurray